Torani Village is a village in Rohtas District in Shivsagar Police Station, Bihar state, India.

Villages in Rohtas district